The Love Thrill is a lost 1927 silent film comedy directed by Millard Webb and starring Laura La Plante and Tom Moore. It was produced and distributed by Universal Pictures.

Cast
Laura La Plante - Joyce Bragdon
Tom Moore - Jack Sturdevant
Bryant Washburn - J. Anthony Creelman
Jocelyn Lee - Paula
Arthur Hoyt - Bragdon
Nat Carr - Solomon
Frank Finch Smiles - Sharpe

References

External links
The Love Thrill @ IMDb.com

lobby posters:..#1,..#2

1927 films
American silent feature films
Lost American films
Films directed by Millard Webb
Universal Pictures films
American black-and-white films
1927 comedy films
Silent American comedy films
1927 lost films
Lost comedy films
1920s American films